Última Hora was a newspaper published in Bolivia. The newspaper began publication on 30 April 1929 and ceased publication in 2001.

References

Defunct newspapers published in Bolivia
Newspapers published in Bolivia
Publications established in 1929
Publications disestablished in 2001
Spanish-language newspapers
1929 establishments in Bolivia
2001 disestablishments in Bolivia